Thomas C. Davis (born May 31, 1960) is a Republican member of the South Carolina Senate since January 14, 2009.  His district (the 46th) includes part of Beaufort County.

Education and law career
Davis graduated magna cum laude in 1982 from Furman University, where he was inducted into Phi Beta Kappa.  He was a member of the Order of the Coif with highest honors at the University of Maryland School of Law, whence he graduated in 1985.

He has worked at the Harvey & Battey law firm in Beaufort, South Carolina, since 1985 and is the managing partner of its Real Estate Department.

Political activity
Davis has been involved in local and state government for many years.

Local government
Davis' activities in the Beaufort area have included service on a four-county council of governments, the county planning board, the Historic Beaufort Foundation, and the local water & sewer authority.

State of South Carolina

Executive
Davis served as Chief of Staff to Governor Mark Sanford and as co-campaign-manager in both of Sanford's elections to the office of governor.  He led the initiative by Sanford's office to pass South Carolina's charter school reform bill in the legislature.  He has also been a member of the South Carolina State Ports Authority board and successfully led South Carolina's negotiations to build a deep water port with Georgia on his state's side of the Savannah River in Jasper County.

Legislative
In the June 10, 2008 Republican primary election for the District 46 Senate seat, Davis defeated the incumbent senator Catherine Ceips, 56% to 44%, then went on to defeat Democrat Kent Fletcher in the general election November 4, 2008, winning 65% of the vote.  Davis is currently assigned to the Agriculture and Natural Resources, Banking and Insurance, Education, Judiciary, and Rules Committees of the Senate.

South Carolina 2018 gubernatorial election
Despite rumors Davis was considering a bid for governor in 2018, Davis decided against running, deciding to stay in the state Senate. After incumbent governor Henry McMaster was unable to win the Republican nomination in the June 12 primary, Davis endorsed McMaster's challenger John Warren, who is running as an outsider candidate with business and military experience, despite not having any political experience.

National politics
In January 2012, Davis endorsed U.S. Rep. Ron Paul for the Republican nomination for U.S. president.

Davis was elected as a South Carolina Republican delegate to the 2012 Republican National Convention.

Davis endorsed Nikki Haley in February 2023 ahead of the 2024 Republican primary.

Personal life
Davis has three daughters with his wife Reid, whom he married in 1985.

References

External links
Senator Tom Davis, official SC Senate website
Tom Davis for State Senate
 

1960 births
Living people
Politicians from New Brunswick, New Jersey
Republican Party South Carolina state senators
South Carolina lawyers
Furman University alumni
University of Maryland Francis King Carey School of Law alumni
People from Beaufort, South Carolina
21st-century American politicians